Bolt gun or boltgun may refer to:
 Captive bolt pistol, a device used for stunning animals before slaughter
 A firearm with a bolt action
 A fictional rock climbing implement featured in the 1993 movie Cliffhanger
 A fictional heavy caliber firearm used by Space Marines in the Warhammer 40,000 universe
 Australian band from Fremantle, Western Australia